Wild Spur is a spur extending from Pulfrich Peak to the west side of Arctowski Peninsula, on the west coast of Graham Land in Antarctica.

Shown on an Argentine government chart of 1957. Named by the United Kingdom Antarctic Place-Names Committee (UK-APC) in 1960 for Heinrich Wild (1833–1902), Swiss instrument designer responsible for the autograph, first used about 1924 for stereosurvey from ground stations and later adapted for air survey.

Ridges of Graham Land
Danco Coast